Barkan is an Israeli settlement in the West Bank. It may also refer to:

People
 Adi Barkan, Israeli model agent and activist
 Alexander Barkan (1909–1990), American labor leader
 Eyal Barkan, Israeli music producer and DJ
 Joel Barkan (1941–2014), American political scientist
 Leonard Barkan, American professor of literature
 Mark Barkan (1934–2020), American songwriter and producer
 Nimrod Barkan (born 1952), Israeli diplomat
 Ross Barkan (born 1989), American journalist and writer
 Seth Flynn Barkan (born 1980), American poet, musician and journalist
 Steven Barkan (born 1951), American sociologist
 Yehuda Barkan (1945-2020), Israeli film actor, producer and director

Places
 Barkan, Nowshahr, a village in Iran
 Barkan, Yemen, a village in Yemen

Other uses
Havelsan Barkan, a Turkish unmanned ground combat vehicle

See also
 Barkhan (disambiguation)